Astiphromma is a genus of parasitoid wasps belonging to the family Ichneumonidae.

The genus was first described by Förster in 1869.

The species of this genus are found in Eurasia and Northern America.

Species:
 Astiphromma anale
 Astiphromma tenuicorne

References

Ichneumonidae
Ichneumonidae genera